The 4th Asian Winter Games were held from January 30 to February 6, 1999, in the province of Kangwon (Gangwon), South Korea. The games were staged in three different clusters in the province which were Yongpyong, Kangnung (Gangneung) and Chunchon (Chuncheon). The name Yongpyong was derived from the Yongpyong Resort.

On December 2, 1993, the Olympic Council of Asia announced that South Korea would host the 4th Asian Winter Games in 1999. South Korea initially aimed to host the previous 3rd games but losted the voting process and the 1999 games are awarded for the country.

Mascot

The 1999 Winter Asiad mascot is Gomdori (곰돌이), a half-moon black bear cub.

Venues

Yongpyong 
 Yongpyong Resort – Alpine skiing and organizing committee
 Yongpyong Indoor Ice Rink – Short track speed skating, figure skating, opening and closing ceremonies
 Provincial nordic venue – Cross-country skiing and Biathlon

Kangnung (Gangneung) 
 Kangnung Indoor Ice Rink – Ice hockey

Chunchon (Chuncheon) 
 Chunchon Outdoor Ice Rink  – Speed skating

Sports
A total of 43 medal events in seven sports were played in the Fourth Winter Asian Games. Freestyle skiing was removed from the program while two more events were added to alpine skiing.

Participating nations
Names are arranged in alphabetical order. A total of 22 Asian NOCs sent delegations, with those that sent only officials.

Non-competing nations

Calendar

Medal table

See also 
 1997 Winter Universiade
 2013 Special Olympics World Winter Games
 2018 Winter Olympics

References

External links
 1999 Asian Winter Games Official website

 
A
Asian
Asian Winter Games
A
A
Sport in Gangwon Province, South Korea
Multi-sport events in South Korea
January 1999 sports events in Asia
February 1999 sports events in Asia